Mor Eusabios Kuriakose is a Syriac Orthodox bishop, currently Metropolitan of Delhi Diocese and Patriarchal Vicar of United Arab Emirates.

Education
Mor Eusabios Kuriakose  has a B.A degree in Sociology from Mar Athanasius College Kothamangalam. He has also studied at Malankara Syrian Orthodox Theological Seminary at Mulanthuruthy for a diploma in Theological Studies and joined Calcutta Bishops college for Bachelor of Divinity. Later he secured a master's in Theology from Pune, Papel Seminary J. D. P.

References

Syriac Orthodox Church bishops
Indian Oriental Orthodox Christians
People from Angamaly
1970 births
Living people